Mesa sti nihta ton allon (Μέσα στην νύχτα των άλλων) is the final album for the band Trypes.  The band's break-up was announced shortly after the album was released. The album contains ten regular tracks by the band plus two bonus tracks.

Είσοδος (Isodos, Entry)
Ακίνδυνο τραγουδάκι (Akindino Tragoudaki, Harmless little song)
Μέσα στη νύχτα των άλλων (Mesa sti nihta ton allon, Within the night of the others)
Διψάω σαν ψάρι στο βυθό (Dipsao san psari sto vitho, I'm thirsty like a fish in sea)
Η αγωνία μου είναι φως (I agonia mou ine fos, My agony is light)
Γιορτή (Giorti, Celebration)
Είμαι ελαφρύς (Ime elafris, I am light)
Χρόνος (Chronos, Time)
Artistz
Δρόμος (Dromos, Way)
Φως (Fos, Light) (Christos Harbilas)
Αέρας (Aeras, Air) (Giorgos Tolios)

External links

Trypes albums
1999 albums